Bhera railway station is located at Bhera, Pakistan.

See also
 List of railway stations in Pakistan
 Pakistan Railways

References

External links

Railway stations in Sargodha District
Defunct railway stations in Pakistan